The 1966 Lehigh Engineers football team was an American football team that represented Lehigh University during the 1966 NCAA College Division football season. Lehigh lost all its games and placed last in both the Middle Atlantic Conference, University Division, and in the Middle Three Conference.

In their second year under head coach Fred Dunlap, the Engineers compiled an 0–9 record. Dick Bauer and Richard Pochman were the team captains.

Lehigh's winless (0–4) record against MAC University Division foes was the worst in the league. Lehigh was also winless (0–2) against its Middle Three rivals, losing to both Lafayette and Rutgers.

Lehigh played its home games at Taylor Stadium on the university campus in Bethlehem, Pennsylvania.

Schedule

References

Lehigh
Lehigh
Lehigh Mountain Hawks football seasons
Lehigh Engineers football
College football winless seasons